Thomas Robinson (7 September 1837 – 3 December 1910) was an English first-class cricketer.

Robinson was born at Redcar in September 1837. He made his debut in first-class cricket against a combined Yorkshire and Durham cricket team against Nottinghamshire at Stockton-on-Tees in 1858. His next first-class appearance followed three years later when he played for a combined Yorkshire with Stockton-on-Tees cricket team against Cambridgeshire. He made his final two first-class appearances in 1862, playing for Yorkshire against Kent at Sheffield, and for the Players in the Gentlemen v Players fixture at Lord's. Robinson scored 63 runs in his four first-class appearances, with a high score of 33. With the ball he took 5 wickets with best figures of 4 for 26. He died at Stockton-on-Tees in December 1910.

References

External links

1837 births
1910 deaths
People from Redcar
English cricketers
Yorkshire and Durham cricketers
Yorkshire with Stockton-on-Tees cricketers
Yorkshire cricketers
Players cricketers